Eulepidotis holoclera is a moth of the family Erebidae first described by Harrison Gray Dyar Jr. in 1914. It is found in the Neotropics, including French Guiana and Guyana.

References

Moths described in 1914
holoclera